Ken Murphy (born 1966/1967) is an Irish business executive. He has been the chief executive (CEO) of Tesco since October 2020.

Early life 
Murphy was born in Cork, Ireland. He was educated there at Christian Brothers College, and earned a bachelor's degree from University College Cork, and an MBA from Harvard Business School. He is a qualified accountant and worked as an accountant at Coopers & Lybrand after graduating from University College Cork in 1988.

Career 
Murphy started his career at Procter & Gamble. When he was 22, Murphy became a finance director at Alliance UniChem, a drugs wholesaler which became part of Boots UK.

In 2013, Murphy became managing director of health and beauty, international and brands at Boots.

After Walgreens took over Boots in 2014, he rose to become chief commercial officer and president of global brands at the parent company, Walgreens Boots Alliance.

In October 2019, it was announced that Murphy would become CEO of Tesco. He succeeded Dave Lewis on 1 October 2020.

Personal life 
Murphy is married with three children.

References

 

Living people
Tesco people
1960s births
Alumni of University College Cork
Harvard Business School alumni
People from Cork (city)
Walgreens people
Irish accountants
Irish chief executives
People educated at Christian Brothers College, Cork